Anak is a figure in the Hebrew Bible said to be the forefather of the Anakites.

Anak may also refer to:
 Anak County, county in South Hwanghae province, North Korea
 Anak Tomb No. 3, archeological site in North Korea
 Boeing 377 Stratocruiser (Israeli Air Force nickname Anak)
 A temple in the role-playing game Drakkhen
 Anak the Parthian, noble who lived in the mid 3rd century who murdered King Khosrov II of Armenia

In Malayo-Polynesian languages such as Indonesian, Malaysian, and Tagalog, anak means "child". In this sense it may refer to:
"Anak" (song), 1977 Filipino song by Freddie Aguilar
Anak (film), 2000 Filipino film
Anak Mindanao, Philippine party list
Anak Krakatoa, island and caldera in Indonesia
Anak Wungsu, Balinese monarch of the 10th century AD